Vidul Glacier is the 7.5 km long and 1.4 km wide glacier on the east side of the main crest of northern Sentinel Range in Ellsworth Mountains, Antarctica.  It is situated northwest of Skaklya Glacier and southwest of the middle course of Newcomer Glacier.  The glacier drains the north slopes of Mount Reimer and the east slopes of Mount Dawson, flows northwards and joins Newcomer Glacier west of Mount Warren in Gromshin Heights.

The glacier is named after the Bulgarian rebel leader Vidul Voyvoda (Vidul Vidulov, 1777-1833).

Location
US mapping in 1961.

See also
 List of glaciers in the Antarctic
 Glaciology

Maps
 Newcomer Glacier.  Scale 1:250 000 topographic map.  Reston, Virginia: US Geological Survey, 1961.
 Antarctic Digital Database (ADD). Scale 1:250000 topographic map of Antarctica. Scientific Committee on Antarctic Research (SCAR). Since 1993, regularly updated.

References
 Vidul Glacier SCAR Composite Gazetteer of Antarctica
 Bulgarian Antarctic Gazetteer Antarctic Place-names Commission (Bulgarian)
 Basic data (English)

External links
 Vidul Glacier. Copernix satellite image

Glaciers of Ellsworth Land
Bulgaria and the Antarctic